Huang Yu Hsiu-luan was a Taiwanese politician who represented Kaoshiung in the First Legislative Yuan from 1981 to 1984. She was succeeded in office by her sister in-law Yu Chen Yueh-ying. Huang Yu Hsiu-luan was married to Huang Yu-jen.

References

20th-century Taiwanese women politicians
Yu family of Kaohsiung
Members of the 1st Legislative Yuan in Taiwan
Kaohsiung Members of the Legislative Yuan
Date of death unknown
Date of birth unknown
Possibly living people
Year of birth missing